Rhimphalea trogusalis is a moth in the family Crambidae. It was described by Francis Walker in 1859. It is found in the Himalayas, Assam, India, the Philippines, Borneo and Sulawesi.

References

Spilomelinae
Moths described in 1859